Bjelica is a Serbian and Montenegrin surname, mostly found in Serbia, Montenegro and Bosnia and Herzegovina, and to a lesser extent in Croatia. The surname is derived from the historical clan region of Bjelice, in Old Montenegro. Émigrés from Bjelice, in order to preserve their origin, adopted the tribal name as surname instead of their own original family or brotherhood (srb. bratstvo) surname; this took place in the 18th and 19th centuries. The vast majority of bearers of the surname are Eastern Orthodox (Serbian Orthodox Church) and declare as ethnic Serbs and Montenegrins, although there are some Muslims (Bosniaks) and Catholics (Croats) with the surname. Most of the Orthodox maintain the tradition of slava (patron saint veneration) of St. John the Baptist (Jovanjdan) - other slavas are present as well (such as  St Paraskevi, i.e. St Petka).

Notable people with the name include:

Ana Bjelica (born 1992), Serbian volleyball player
Dimitrije Bjelica (born 1935), Serbian chess FIDE Master and journalist
Isidora Bjelica (1967–2020), Bosnian-born Serbian prose writer
Milan Bjelica (born 1956), Deputy Chief of Serbian General Staff of the Serbian Armed Forces
Milka Bjelica (born 1981), Serbian-born Montenegrin basketball player
Milko Bjelica (born 1984), Serbian-born Montenegrin basketball player
Nemanja Bjelica (born 1988), Serbian basketball player
Nenad Bjelica (born 1971), Croatian football manager and former player
Novica Bjelica (born 1983), Serbian volleyball player

References

Dragutin R. Bjelica, Bjelice, kazivanja o plemenu i bratstvima, Beograd, 1996
Jovan Erdeljanović, Stara Crna Gora: Etnička prošlost i formiranje crnogorskih plemena, Beograd, 1978

Serbian surnames
Montenegrin surnames